Brenda Lynn Siegel is an American activist and politician who was the Democratic nominee in the 2022 Vermont gubernatorial election. She previously ran in the Democratic primaries for lieutenant governor of Vermont in 2020 and for governor of Vermont in 2018.

Activism 
Siegel is an activist for housing and drug policy. Siegel and fellow activists slept on the steps leading to the Vermont State House for 27 nights to protest homelessness and advocate for the reinstatement of a Vermont program to provide housing in motels during the COVID-19 pandemic. She left when the Department for Children and Families updated their "adverse weather conditions" emergency housing policy for the upcoming winter. Siegel has also advocated for the decriminalization of small amounts of the narcotic buprenorphine.

2022 gubernatorial campaign

Democratic primary 
Siegel announced her candidacy on May 2, 2022. Siegel was the only gubernatorial candidate in the Democratic primary. NBC News projected her primary win just after the polls closed. Siegel was endorsed by former governor Howard Dean, state Rep. Kevin "Coach" Christie D-Windsor 4-2, state Rep. Tristan Toleno D-Windham 2-3, Rutland Alderman Anna Tadio, and youth advocate Addie Lentzner. She was also endorsed by Sierra Club Vermont, Vermont Conservation Voters, VPIRG, and Rights and Democracy.

General election 
The general election took place on November 8, 2022; she lost by a wide margin. Siegel ran against the Republican nominee, incumbent governor Phil Scott.

Personal life 
Siegel grew up in Brattleboro, Vermont and currently lives in Newfane. Her brother died of a drug overdose when Siegel was 19, and her nephew died of the same cause in 2018. Siegel is a single mother to her son Ajna, and the two experienced various financial hardships, including some as a result of tropical storm Irene.
 
Siegel was an intern for then-Rep. Bernie Sanders' office in 2001.

References

External links 

Brenda Siegel for Vermont campaign website
 

21st-century American politicians
21st-century American women politicians
Bisexual politicians
Bisexual women
Hampshire College alumni
LGBT people from Vermont
American LGBT politicians
Living people
People from Brattleboro, Vermont
People from Newfane, Vermont
Vermont Democrats
Women in Vermont politics
Year of birth missing (living people)